Keith Bennett may refer to:
Keith Bennett (basketball) (born 1961), American-Israeli basketball player
Keith Bennett (Canadian football) (1931–1995), Canadian football player
Keith Bennett, victim in the Moors murders